Senator Merwin may refer to:

Orange Merwin (1777–1853), Connecticut State Senate
Samuel E. Merwin (1831–1907), Connecticut State Senate